The United States Air Force's 438th Air Expeditionary Advisory Group (438 AEAG) is assigned to the 438th Air Expeditionary Wing of USAFCENT and is stationed at Kabul Airport, Afghanistan.

The 438th Air Expeditionary Group stood up on in November 2008 at Kabul Airport, Afghanistan to train fixed and rotary wing aircrew and maintenance me.

History

Global War On Terrorism
The 438th Air Expeditionary Group was activated as part of the Global War On Terror in 2008.

Lineage
 Constituted as the 438th Air Expeditionary Advisory Group on 23 October 2008
 Activated on 1 November 2008

Assignments
 438th Air Expeditionary Wing, 2008–present

Components
 438th Air Expeditionary Advisory Squadron - renamed 311th Air Expeditionary Advisory Squadron, February 2016, to follow in the traditions of No. 311 (Czech) Squadron RAF under Czech Air Force command. The 311 Squadron was disbanded in February 2019.
 439th Air Expeditionary Advisory Squadron
 440th Air Expeditionary Advisory Squadron
 538th Air Expeditionary Advisory Squadron
 738th Air Expeditionary Advisory Squadron
 Detachment 1 (Jalalabad)
 Detachment 3 (Mazar-e-Shariff)

Stations
 Kabul Airport, Afghanistan, 1 November 2008 – present

Aircraft
 Mil Mi-17 Hip, Present
 Mil Mi-35 Hind, Present
 C-27A, Present

References

Air expeditionary groups of the United States Air Force
Military units and formations established in 2008
Military advisory groups